The Bradford Bulls Youth Development was the youth system of the rugby league club Bradford Bulls. It was one of the most famous and successful youth systems for rugby league and produced some of the best players in both rugby league and rugby union. The Bradford Bulls  Youth Development consisted of three main teams, the Senior Academy, the Junior Academy and the Service Area team. Youth Development system also included scouting for the local area and education for the players in the academy teams.

The Academy

The Senior Academy (from 2013 the Under 19's) was the highest tier in the Youth Development system. Any players under the age of 19 years were eligible to play for the senior academy; the rules also permitted three players over the age of 21 to play in academy matches. Most of the team was made up of fringe squad players and those first team players recovering from injury but also some of the best players from the junior academy were given experience in the senior academy. The Bradford Bulls Senior Academy was one of the best in the country and produced more professional Rugby League players than any other Academy in the country. The success of the Bradford Bulls Academy decreased in its latter years, many Senior Academy players were promoted to the first team squad at quite a young age and either secured a first team places or were released to other clubs. This meant that players from the junior academy players were drafted into the senior academy but were often playing against opposition much older than themselves.

Notable former players

Former staff

Lee St Hilaire

Basil Richards

Paul Medley

Richard Tunningley

Academy
Sports academies